Nigrini is a surname. Notable people with the surname include:
 Mark Nigrini, South African-born American academic
 Peter Nigrini, American projection designer

See also
 Negrini